Black Belt Angels is a 1994 American film co-written and directed by Chi Kim and starring Shawna Larson, Rebekah Bartlett, Shannon Marketic, Nicole Burks, Ka'imi Kuoha and Frank DeAngelo.

Premise
A greedy mobster plans to close down The Master Martial Artsschool, but he is unaware that its owner and his four daughters all have black belts and are prepared to fight to save it.

Cast
 Shawna Larson as Kirsten Robinson
 Rebekah Bartlett as Tracy Robinson
 Shannon Marketic as Julie Morgan
 Nicole Burks as Shawna
 Ka'imi Kuoha as Lupe
 Frank DeAngelo as Mr. Lucero

Production
Black Belt Angels was mostly filmed at San Diego, California.

References

External links
 
 
 Black Belt Angels at Film Affinity

1994 films
American action films
1990s English-language films
Films scored by Nathan Wang
1990s American films